Taranjeh may refer to:
Ghajar, Golan Heights
Tarancheh, Iran